The Prince of the Mountains (German:Der Fürst der Berge) is a 1921 German silent film directed by and starring Harry Piel.

Cast
In alphabetical order
 Maria Asti 
 Charly Berger 
 Friedrich Berger 
 Sascha Gura as Juana 
 Alfred Kuehne as Mynther van Zaanten  
 Kurt Mathé 
 Harry Piel as Unus  
 Fritz Ruß 
 Gaby Ungar as Edith van Zaanten

References

Bibliography
 Cheryl Krasnick Warsh & Dan Malleck. Consuming Modernity: Gendered Behaviour and Consumerism before the Baby Boom. UBC Press, 2013.

External links

1921 films
Films of the Weimar Republic
Films directed by Harry Piel
German silent feature films
German black-and-white films